Natalie Barratt (born 6 March 1975) is a British racing driver. She has competed in the British Rally Championship and World Rally Championship. She took a break 2013 to focus on her family life (daughter Frances and son Magnus). She returned in 2020 to take part in Projekt E, winning the inaugural championship.

Racing record

Complete JWRC results

Complete PWRC Results

Complete FIA World Rallycross Championship results
(key)

Projekt E Series

See also
List of female World Rally Championship drivers

References

External links
Official website

1975 births
Living people
Sportspeople from Manchester
English female racing drivers
Female rally drivers
English rally drivers
World Rally Championship drivers